Morvan Regional Natural Park (French: Parc naturel régional du Morvan) is a protected area of woodlands, lakes and traditional farmland in the Bourgogne-Franche-Comté region of central France. The area was officially designated as a regional natural park in 1970.

The maison du parc (main visitors center) is located in the small commune of Saint-Brisson. It maintains one of the park's six natural history museums (Écomusée de Morvan).

Member communes
The park includes 117 communes as well as five associated partner communes.

 Aisy-sous-Thil • Alligny-en-Morvan • Anost • Antully • Arleuf • Arnay-le-Duc • Asquins • Autun • Avallon
 Bard-le-Régulier • Bazoches • Beauvilliers • Blanot • Blismes • Brassy • Brazey-en-Morvan • Bussières
 Cervon • Chalaux • Champeau-en-Morvan • Chastellux-sur-Cure • Château-Chinon (Campagne) • Château-Chinon (Ville) • Châtillon-en-Bazois • Châtin • Chaumard  • Chissey-en-Morvan • Corancy • Cussy-en-Morvan
 Domecy-sur-Cure • Dommartin • Dompierre-en-Morvan • Dun-les-Places • Dun-sur-Grandry
 Étang-sur-Arroux
 Fâchin • Foissy-lès-Vézelay • Fontenay-près-Vézelay
 Gâcogne • Gien-sur-Cure • Glux-en-Glenne • Gouloux
 Island
 Juillenay
 La Celle-en-Morvan • La Comelle • La Grande-Verrière • La Motte-Ternant • La Petite-Verrière • La Roche-en-Brenil • Lacour-d'Arcenay • Larochemillay • Lavault-de-Frétoy • Liernais • Lormes • Lucenay-l'Évêque • Luzy
 Magny • Marigny-l'Église • Ménessaire • Mhère • Millay • Molphey • Montigny-en-Morvan • Montigny-Saint-Barthélemy • Montlay-en-Auxois • Montreuillon • Montsauche-les-Settons • Moulins-Engilbert • Moux-en-Morvan
 Onlay • Ouroux-en-Morvan
 Pierre-Perthuis • Planchez • Poil • Pontaubert • Pouques-Lormes • Précy-sous-Thil • Préporché
 Quarré-les-Tombes
 Roussillon-en-Morvan • Rouvray
 Saint-Agnan • Saint-Andeux • Saint-André-en-Morvan • Saint-Brisson • Saint-Didier • Saint-Didier-sur-Arroux • Saint-Germain-de-Modéon • Saint-Germain-des-Champs • Saint-Hilaire-en-Morvan • Saint-Honoré-les-Bains • Saint-Léger-de-Fougeret • Saint-Léger-sous-Beuvray • Saint-Léger-Vauban • Saint-Martin-de-la-Mer • Saint-Martin-du-Puy • Saint-Père • Saint-Péreuse • Saint-Prix-lès-Arnay • Sainte-Magnance • Saulieu • Savilly • Sermages • Sincey-lès-Rouvray • Sommant
 Tharoiseau • Thil-sur-Arroux • Thoisy-la-Berchère
Uchon
Vauclaix • Vézelay • Vianges • Vic-sous-Thil • Villapourçon • Villargoix • Villiers-en-Morvan

Partner communes 
 Arnay-le-Duc • Autun • Corbigny • Châtillon-en-Bazois • Saint-Brancher

See also
 Herbularium du Morvan
 List of regional natural parks of France

References

Sources

External links

 Official park website 
 Morvan tourism association 

Regional natural parks of France
Geography of Nièvre
Geography of Côte-d'Or
Geography of Saône-et-Loire
Geography of Yonne
Protected areas established in 1970
Tourist attractions in Bourgogne-Franche-Comté
Tourist attractions in Côte-d'Or
Tourist attractions in Nièvre
Tourist attractions in Saône-et-Loire
Tourist attractions in Yonne